Roric Edward Harrison (born September 20, 1946) is a former Major League Baseball pitcher. He was the last American League pitcher to hit a home run in an American League game (October 3) before the introduction of the designated hitter.

Early years
Harrison amassed a 13–28 record in Houston's farm system and pitched just two innings for the Oklahoma City 89ers in  when he was dealt to the Seattle Pilots with Dooley Womack for Jim Bouton.

During Spring training the following season, he and Marion Jackson were traded to the Baltimore Orioles for Marcelino López.

Baltimore Orioles
The best pitcher in the International League that year, he attended spring training with the Orioles in 1972. He made the team, but as a relief, as Baltimore's four starters had each won 20 or more games the previous year. He did, however, make two emergency starts in the second games of doubleheaders, going 1–1 with a 6.75 in his two starts. For the season, he went 3–4 with a 2.30 ERA and four saves.

Atlanta Braves
After just one season in Baltimore, Harrison was traded along with Davey Johnson, Pat Dobson and Johnny Oates to the Atlanta Braves for Earl Williams and Taylor Duncan on the last day of the Winter Meetings on December 1, 1972. Harrison was used as both a starter and reliever in Atlanta, compiling an 11–8 record and 4.16 ERA in both roles. He also added two home runs to his career total despite having only three hits all season (the other was a double).

Harrison was 20–23 with a 4.45 ERA in his career for Atlanta when he was dealt to the Cleveland Indians during the  season for pitcher Blue Moon Odom.

Journeyman
Harrison went 7–7 with a 4.79 ERA in nineteen starts for the Indians in 1975. During Spring training , he was dealt to the St. Louis Cardinals for Harry Parker. After one season playing triple A ball for the franchise, he was released. In nine games, he was 0–1 with a 7.50 ERA.

References

External links
, or Venezuelan Professional Baseball League statistics

1946 births
Atlanta Braves players
Asheville Tourists players
Baltimore Orioles players
Baseball players from California
Bismarck-Mandan Pards players
Cleveland Indians players
Cocoa Astros players
Dallas–Fort Worth Spurs players
Evansville Triplets players
Living people
Llaneros de Portuguesa players
Major League Baseball pitchers
Minnesota Twins players
Oklahoma City 89ers players
Portland Beavers players
Rochester Red Wings players
Salisbury Astros players
Tiburones de La Guaira players
American expatriate baseball players in Venezuela
Tigres de Aragua players
Toledo Mud Hens players
Tulsa Oilers (baseball) players
Westchester High School (Los Angeles) alumni